Gerasim (Russian Герасим) is a male given name, derived from Greek γεράσιμος (cf. Gerasimos), meaning "Respectable", "Honorable Elder".

First name
 Gerasim Izmailov, Russian navigator
 Gerasim - deaf and mute serf, a character in  Ivan Turgenev's short story Mumu
 Gerasim Khugayev (born 1945), Ossetian politician
 Gerasim Lebedev (1749 – 1817), Russian adventurer, linguist
 Gerasim Pileš (1913 - 2003), a Soviet Chuvash writer playwright, sculptor, painter.
 Gerasim I, Serbian Patriarch, Archbishop of Peć and Serbian Patriarch (1574-1586)
 Gerasim Zakov (born 1984), Bulgarian footballer 
 Gerasim Zelić (1752 – 1828), a Serbian Orthodox Church archimandrite, traveller and writer
 Gerasim Petronović (1820-1906), Serbian Orthodox Bishop of Bay of Kotor and writer
 Gjerasim Qiriazi (Gerasim Kyrias) (1858 – 1894), an Albanian Protestant preacher and educator.

Related surnames
 Gerasimov

See also
 Gerasimos (disambiguation)

References 

Slavic masculine given names
Bulgarian masculine given names
Russian masculine given names
Given names of Greek language origin
Serbian masculine given names